Kummankudi  is a village in the Arimalam revenue block of Pudukkottai district, Tamil Nadu, India.

Demographics 

As per the 2001 census, Kummankudi had a total population of  
3863 with 1841 males and 2022 females. Out of the total  
population 1862 people were literate.

References

Villages in Pudukkottai district